Urophora repeteki is a species of fruit fly in the family Tephritidae.

Distribution
Cyprus, Turkey & Kazakhstan to Israel, Iran & Afghanistan.

References

Urophora
Insects described in 1934
Diptera of Europe
Diptera of Asia